Metal Hits may refer to:

Metal Hits (Ratt album), 2003 compilation album
Metal Hits (Dio album), 2005 compilation album